The Älvsborg Line is a railway line between Uddevalla and Borås in Sweden.

Västtrafik runs regional train service on the whole line, usually with X12 trains. 
Due to its bad standard and slow speed, few freight trains use this line and instead travel via Gothenburg and the Western Main line. Some freight trains are diverted to this line when the Western Main Line is closed for maintenance.

During 2021, the stretch between Herrljunga and Borås is being renovated to a higher standard. That includes replacing manual train dispatching (System M), with automatic train dispatching (System H).

Railway lines in Sweden